The Ibanez Artcore series is Ibanez's line of semi and full hollowbody electric guitars.

Background and press
The first Ibanez Artcore models were released in mid-2002 by Ibanez, whose goal was to offer an affordable range of full-hollow and semi-hollow body guitars that appealed to entry level guitarists who were unable or unwilling to pay big money on high-priced guitars. The Artcore series has developed a reputation for being one of the best value guitars on the market and has been praised by reviewers, being highly respected for their tone, sustain and the way they hold their tuning.

After 2017, many models no longer used rosewood and bubinga, and some models that sported maple and mahogany have substituted in linden and nyatoh woods.

Models

Discontinued

See also
 Ibanez
 Semi-acoustic guitar
 Ibanez AF195 AV

References/external links
 Ibanez's Official 
 Musicians Friend Review of AFS-75T
 Guitar World's Review of AFS-77TMG and AXD-81VLS – Review also features opinions on the whole Artcore series

Artcore series